Milne Force was a garrison Australian Army force formed in July 1942 during the World War II which controlled allied naval, land and air units in the region of Milne Bay, in the Territory of Papua. The force was responsible for constructing airstrips, roads, camps and defensive positions.

Milne Force successfully withheld a Japanese invasion which landed on 25 August during the Battle of Milne Bay and forced the invasion force to retreat on 5 September.

On 1 October 1942, Milne Force was redesignated the 11th Division.

Commanders 

Brigadier John Field (11 July – 23 August 1942)
Major General Cyril Clowes (23 August – 1 October 1942)

Units 
7th Brigade
9th Battalion
25th Battalion
61st Battalion
18th Brigade
2/9th Battalion
2/10th Battalion
2/12th Battalion
2/5th Field Regiment
4th Battery, 101st Anti-tank Regiment
6th Heavy Anti-aircraft Battery
9th Light Anti-aircraft Battery
24th Field Company
Royal Australian Air Force
No. 32 Squadron (Lockheed Hudson)
No. 75 Squadron (P-40 Kittyhawk)
No. 76 Squadron (P-40 Kittyhawk)
United States forces
709th US Airborne Anti-aircraft Battery
101st US Coast Artillery Battalion
2nd Battalion, 43rd US Engineer Regiment
E Company, 46th US Engineer Regiment

References 
Milne Bay units, August–September 1942

South West Pacific theatre of World War II
Papua New Guinea in World War II
Military units and formations of Australia in World War II
Ad hoc units and formations of Australia
Military units and formations established in 1942
Military units and formations disestablished in 1942